George Geary (9 July 1893 – 6 March 1981) was a first-class cricketer who played for Leicestershire County Cricket Club and the England cricket team.

Abilities
Above medium pace and right-handed, Geary was able to swing the new ball very effectively, but relied for most of his success on his amazing persistence and ability to bowl with slight yet well-disguised variations of pace and cut. He was able to bowl quite incredible numbers of overs on unresponsive pitches, as shown in the last Test of the 1928/1929 Ashes tour, when he bowled an amazing 81 overs on a typical billiard-table Australian wicket in very hot weather. Because he was tall and very solidly built, he was able both to get bounce and to bowl the long spells required for success in Australian conditions which destroyed the reputations of all English bowlers of slighter build.

Geary was also a capable lower order batsman who usually relied upon hitting, but could get runs with a quiet, if unstylish determination when they were desperately needed. Though he never scored a thousand runs – his best aggregates were 923 in 1929 and 900 in 1925 – his runs were frequently of great value to a county that never possessed any of the exceptionally high-class batsmen other counties could command in Geary's heyday. Owing to his considerable height and reach, Geary was an excellent slip catcher and, despite all the bowling he had to do, almost always his county's leading fielder.

Early career

For all his build and strength, and his shrewd skill, George Geary proved a quite nervous starter in the cricket world. He played a few times for Leicestershire in 1912, and in 1913 established himself as the leading bowler of what became a very weak bowling side in good weather owing to the tragic illness of Tom Jayes. The last year before the First World War saw Geary come right to the front with 114 wickets for just over 20 runs apiece, far ahead of any other bowler in the team.

While  serving in the air force during the war, Geary was unlucky to have his leg cut by an aeroplane propeller and this affected, at least temporarily, his great strength and powerful build. After a very disappointing season in 1919 in which his wickets cost over 34 runs each, Geary did not play a single first-class game in 1920 – preferring the financial incentives of a Lancashire League professional job. He played a few times in midweek games in 1921, and was so successful that he took 23 wickets on unresponsive pitches and decided to commit himself to Leicestershire again.

He was bowled relatively little (though with good success) during 1922, but the following year saw him advance into the elite of bowlers with 115 wickets for less the eighteen runs apiece, and in 1924, seemingly out of necessity given the terrible weakness of Leicestershire's batting, Geary advanced so much that he scored 864 runs for an average of 24, which was excellent in so appallingly wet a summer, and was probably denied the "double" only by an injury during June. His test debut against a weak South African side was due only to England experimenting after the rubber had been decided and was of no consequence. Remarkably given how little service he had given to Leicestershire, Geary received a benefit but it was severely affected by rain.

Test career

In 1925 he advanced even further, scoring a maiden century against Kent, then June 1926 saw Geary produce two of his finest performances against powerful batting sides (even considering the treacherous pitches): he took fourteen cheap wickets against both Hampshire and Lancashire. The latter match was Lancashire's last defeat for over a year and a half. He consequently played in two of the Tests that year and saved England from defeat at Headingley with some steady batting whilst George Macaulay hit up 76, but took only three wickets. 1927, with so many very dead wickets, was a struggle for Geary, but on the matting wickets of South Africa he bowled so well to be regarded as the most dangerous bowler since the incomparable Sydney Barnes, taking twelve wickets at Johannesburg.

However, a severe arm injury ruled Geary out of the last three Tests and, though he batted with some success in many games in 1928, he could bowl so little that he took only ten expensive wickets. Yet, his powerful build was seen as so vital for the rock-hard Australian pitches that Geary, with the reputation he had acquired, was still chosen. He proved a great success, heading the averages and working amazingly hard to back up probably the strongest batting side any country has ever fielded – so strong that men of such class as Phil Mead and Ernest Tyldesley could not keep their Test places. Following on from this, 1929 was his best season ever, for he exceeded 150 wickets and on a rain-affected pitch against an admittedly weak Glamorgan batting lineup had the astonishing figures of 10 wickets for 18 runs, which was at the time the best bowling figures in the history of first-class cricket. He also had his highest ever batting aggregate with 923 runs. 1930, with the Australians back, saw Geary as powerless as all of England's other bowlers to stop the onslaught of Bradman, and he was also affected by injury. With Voce and Bowes developing he had no chance of retaining his Test place in the following years. Geary still bowled well in the wet summers of 1931 and 1932, but the dry summer of 1933 was disastrous: Geary took only 40 wickets and not once took five in an innings.

However, despite further injuries, in 1934 he bowled so well when fit that he was chosen for two Tests but his only significant contribution was an innings of 53 against the marvellous leg spin bowling of Grimmett and O'Reilly at Trent Bridge. These were his last Tests.

Late career

In 1935 Geary was in such deadly form on fiery or sticky pitches early in the season that, despite injuries hampering him later, he was second in the averages to Hedley Verity and took 11 for 40 in one match against Sussex. In his second benefit match the following year, Geary produced his best bowling since 1929 on a broken pitch with an amazing 7 for 7 and 13 for 43 in the match. His last two seasons in 1937 and 1938 saw him decline with the ball on improved Leicester pitches, but his batting in 1938 was so good that he averaged over 30 – far above any previous season – and hit three centuries.

Retirement and death

His retirement at the end of that year did not mark the close of Geary's involvement with cricket. For over twenty years after that he was cricket coach at Charterhouse and in that time was seen as one of the best coaches any school has ever had. Most notably, the brilliant batsman Peter May admitted that Geary's coaching played a vital role in his development. After he left Charterhouse in 1959, Geary went to Rugby School, who were desperate for assistance to develop young players and improved their fortunes. Geary, as always, served them whole-heartedly, and he bowled, without the sweater to keep him cool, in the nets until he was about seventy-seven, a testimony to his amazing endurance despite many injuries and other setbacks. He died after gradually failing health in 1981 at the age of eighty-seven.

References

External links

 

1893 births
1981 deaths
England Test cricketers
Leicestershire cricketers
Royal Air Force cricketers
Wisden Cricketers of the Year
People from Barwell
Cricketers from Leicestershire
English cricketers
Players cricketers
Cricketers who have taken ten wickets in an innings
Marylebone Cricket Club cricketers
S. B. Joel's XI cricketers
English cricketers of 1919 to 1945
C. I. Thornton's XI cricketers
North v South cricketers
L. H. Tennyson's XI cricket team
Marylebone Cricket Club Australian Touring Team cricketers
Marylebone Cricket Club South African Touring Team cricketers